Events from the year 1606 in France

Incumbents
 Monarch – Henry IV

Events
 February 12 – Maximilien de Béthune becomes 1st Duke of Sully in the Peerage of France.
 February 24 – Commercial treaty between France and England signed in Paris.
 March 15 – The king leaves Paris to besiege Sedan and end the revolt of the Duke of Bouillon, who submits on April 2. On April 6 the king enters the town and on April 28 returns to Paris.
 March 22 – The assembly of the French clergy grants the king a "free gift" (dons gratuits) of  livres.
 April 2 – Treaty for the protection of the Principality of Sedan.
 June 3 – The Duke of Sully is named captain lieutenant in the Queen’s company.
 June 9 – Accident at the Neuilly-sur-Seine ferry: the king and queen with others of the court, returning from Saint-Germain to Paris, nearly drown. The king orders construction of the first, wooden, Pont de Neuilly, built between 1609 and 1611.
 December 18 – Richelieu is nominated Bishop of Luçon.
 December – Edict on reform of the Catholic clergy.

Births
 February 10 – Christine of France, Duchess of Savoy (d. 1663)
 February 27 – Laurent de La Hyre, Baroque painter (d. 1656)
 April 6 – Amable de Bourzeys, writer and academic (d. 1672)
 June 6 – Pierre Corneille, dramatist (d. 1684)
 July 13 – Roland Fréart de Chambray, architectural theorist (d. 1676)
 October 1 – Julian Maunoir, Jesuit priest (d. 1683)
 October 30 – Jean-Jacques Bouchard, erotic writer (d. 1641)
 November 12 – Jeanne Mance, nurse and settler in Montreal (d. 1673)
 date unknown
 Pierre du Ryer, dramatist (d. 1658)
 Charles Errard, painter, architect and engraver (d. 1689)

Deaths
 March 25 – François de Bar, French scholar (b. 1538)
 October 5 – Philippe Desportes, French poet (b. 1546)

See also

References

1600s in France